Kolton is both a given name and a Polish and Jewish surname. Notable people with the name include:

Given name
Kolton Browning (born 1990), American football player
Kolton Lee, British film director
Kolton Miller (born 1995), American football player

Surname
Chad Kolton, American public relations person
Paul Kolton (1923–2010), American reporter
Tamara Kolton (born 1970), American spiritual teacher

See also
Colton (given name)
Kolten, given name
Colton (surname)

Polish-language surnames
Jewish surnames